This article shows the roster of all participating teams at the 2018 FIVB Volleyball Women's World Championship.

Pool A

Argentina
The following is the Argentinian roster in the 2018 World Championship.

Head coach: Guillermo Orduna

Cameroon
The following is the Cameroonian roster in the 2018 World Championship.

Head coach: Jean-René Akono

Germany
The following is the German roster in the 2018 World Championship.

Head coach: Felix Koslowski

Japan
The following is the Japanese roster in the 2018 World Championship.

Head coach: Kumi Nakada

Mexico
The following is the Mexican roster in the 2018 World Championship.

Head coach:  Ricardo Naranjo

Netherlands
The following is the Dutch roster in the 2018 World Championship.

Head coach:  Jamie Morrison

Pool B

Bulgaria
The following is the Bulgarian roster in the 2018 World Championship.

Head coach: Ivan Petkov

Canada
The following is the Canadian roster in the 2018 World Championship.

Head coach:  Marcello Abbondanza

China
The following is the Chinese roster in the 2018 World Championship.

Head coach: Lang Ping

Cuba
The following is the Cuban roster in the 2018 World Championship.

Head coach: Tomás Fernández

Italy
The following is the Italian roster in the 2018 World Championship.

Head coach: Davide Mazzanti

Turkey
The following is the Turkish roster in the 2018 World Championship.

Head coach:  Giovanni Guidetti

Pool C

Azerbaijan
The following is the Azerbaijani roster in the 2018 World Championship.

Head coach: Faig Garayev

Russia
The following is the Russian roster in the 2018 World Championship.

Head coach: Vadim Pankov

South Korea
The following is the South Korean roster in the 2018 World Championship.

Head coach: Cha Hae-won

Thailand
The following is the Thai roster in the 2018 World Championship.

Head coach: Danai Sriwatcharamethakul

Trinidad and Tobago
The following is the Trinidadian and Tobagonian roster in the 2018 World Championship.

Head coach: Francisco Cruz Jiménez

United States
The following is the American roster in the 2018 World Championship.

Head coach: Karch Kiraly

Pool D

Brazil
The following is the Brazilian roster in the 2018 World Championship.

Head coach: José Roberto Guimarães

Dominican Republic
The following is the Dominican roster in the 2018 World Championship.

Head coach:  Marcos Kwiek

Kazakhstan
The following is the Kazakhstan roster in the 2018 World Championship.

Head coach: Vyacheslav Shapran

Kenya
The following is the Kenyan roster in the 2018 World Championship.

Head coach: Japheth Munala

Puerto Rico
The following is the Puerto Rican roster in the 2018 World Championship.

Head coach: José Mieles

Serbia
The following is the Serbian roster in the 2018 World Championship.

Head coach: Zoran Terzić

See also
2018 FIVB Volleyball Men's World Championship squads

References

External links

2018 FIVB Volleyball Women's World Championship
FIVB Volleyball Women's World Championship squads